WCRL (1570 AM) is a radio station licensed to serve Oneonta, Alabama. The station is owned by Our Town Radio, Inc. and began operation on July 29, 1952. WCRL airs a classic hits music format.

History
The station was assigned the WCRL call sign by the Federal Communications Commission. The station has been owned by the L.D. Bentley Jr. family since the early 1950s, through Blount County Broadcasting Service, Inc. In 1968 the station added an FM sister, WKLD. That station was sold to Great South Wireless LLC in a deal that was completed in September 2008.

In November 2002, control of Blount County Broadcasting Service legally passed from Luther Daniel Bentley Jr. to Luther Daniel Bentley III. The younger Bentley and his sister, Teresa B. Lowry, now respectively own 51% and 49% of the corporation.

On March 30, 2012, Blount County Broadcasting Service, Inc., reached a deal to sell WCRL and its translator, W237DH, to Our Town Radio, Inc., for $180,000. The FCC approved the sale on May 14, 2012, and the transaction was consummated on June 1, 2012. Our Town Radio, Inc., is owned by Mark S. Sims (51%) and Robbie McAlpine (49%) of Oneonta, Alabama.

Translators
WCRL rebroadcasts its signal on two FM translators:

References

External links
WCRL official website

CRL
Classic hits radio stations in the United States
Radio stations established in 1952
Blount County, Alabama
1952 establishments in Alabama